The Florida Space Institute (FSI) is a research institute of the State University System of Florida and the University of Central Florida located in Orlando, Florida, United States.

FSI is currently led by Interim Director Dr. Julie Brisset.

History
The Florida Space Institute, previously the Space Education and Research Center created in 1990 by UCF, was established in 1996 as a research institute within the State University System of Florida. In 2012, the institute moved from the Kennedy Space Center to the Central Florida Research Park at UCF. The move coincided with the end of the Space Shuttle program in 2011.

Partner institutions
The Florida Space Institute is part of a broad statewide partnership within the State University System to support and expand Florida's involvement in the field of space exploration. Since its move to Orlando, the institute falls under the organizational and fiscal governance of UCF, though it continues to support research and development projects and services at partner institutions in the State University System as well as government and corporate institutions.

Educational partners 
 Brevard Community College
 Broward College
 Embry Riddle Aeronautical University
 Florida Agricultural and Mechanical University
 Florida Atlantic University
 Florida Institute of Technology
 University of Florida
 University of Miami
 University of South Florida

Government partners 
 Federal Emergency Management Agency
 NASA
 NASA Ames Research Center
 NASA Goddard Space Flight Center
 Kennedy Space Center
 National Science Foundation

Corporate partner 
 Yang Enterprises

Science

Arecibo Observatory
The Arecibo Observatory has the world's most powerful planetary radar system, which provides ground-based observations whose quality could only be exceeded with a spacecraft flyby. The 305-meter Arecibo telescope equipped with a 1 MW transmitter at S-band (12.6 cm, 2380 MHz) is used for studies of small bodies in the solar system, terrestrial planets, and planetary satellites including the Moon. The Arecibo planetary radar is a powerful tool for post-discovery characterization of near-Earth objects, planets, and moons. In addition to precise line-of-sight velocity and range information, depending on the target's size and distance, planetary radar is useful for quickly estimating the instantaneous rotation rate of near-Earth asteroids, resolving the target's size, detecting potential satellites, and ultimately resolving the shape through inverse modeling efforts.

Researchers: Dr. Maxime Devogele, Dr. Estela Fernandez-Valenzuela, Dr. Sean Marshall, Dr. Anna McGilvray, Dr. Noemi Pinilla-Alonso, Dr. Mario De Pra, Dr. Charles Schambeau, Dr. Ana Carolina De Souza Feliciano, Dr. Flaviane Venditti, Dr. Luisa Fernanda Zambrano-Marin.

Astrophysics 
Radio astronomy is the study of radio waves produced by a multitude of astronomical objects such as the Sun, planets, pulsars, stars, star-forming regions (i.e., the birthplace of stars), gas clouds, galaxies, supernova remnants, etc. The high sensitivity of the Arecibo radio telescope allows astronomers to detect faint radio signals from far-off regions of the universe. The areas of research include Fast radio bursts, Heliophysics and Space weather, Pulsar Studies, Spectral line Studies, Exoplanets, and Very Long Baseline Interferometry (VLBI).

Researchers: Dr. Periasamy K. Manoharan, Dr. Anna McGilvray, Dr. Benetge Bhakthi Pranama Perera, Dr. Anish Roshi, Dr. Allison Smith, Dr. Sravani Vaddi.

Atmospheric sciences 
Atmospheric science is the investigation of the earth's gaseous envelope. Experiments performed at Arecibo measure upper atmosphere composition, temperature, and densities in order to understand the controlling physical processes. The Arecibo Radio Telescope can measure the growth and decay of disturbances in the changing layers of charged particles that populate the region known as the ionosphere ( altitudes above 30 miles ). The "big dish" is also used to study plasma physics processes in the electrically charged regions of the earth's atmosphere. where radio waves are influenced most.

Researchers: Dr. Christiano Garnett Marques Brum, Dr. Selvaraj Dharmalingam, Dr. Jens Lautenbach, Dr. Shikha Raizada, Dr. Pedrina Terra dos Santos, Dr. Sukanta Sau, Dr. Michael Peter Sulzer.

Publications 
 Brisset, J., Miletich, T. and Metzger, P., 2020. Thermal extraction of water ice from the lunar surface-A 3D numerical model. Planetary and Space Science, 193, p.105082.
 Brisset, J., Colwell, J., Dove, A., Abukhalil, S., Cox, C. and Mohammed, N., 2018. Regolith behavior under asteroid-level gravity conditions: low-velocity impact experiments. Progress in Earth and Planetary Science, 5(1), pp.1-21.
  Brisset, J., Heißelmann, D., Kothe, S., Weidling, R. and Blum, J., 2016. Submillimetre-sized dust aggregate collision and growth properties-Experimental study of a multi-particle system on a suborbital rocket. Astronomy & Astrophysics, 593, p.A3.

See also
 University of Central Florida research centers

References

External links
 Florida Space Institute
 University of Central Florida
 Florida Space Grant Consortium
 Arecibo Observatory

Universities and colleges in Orlando, Florida
State University System of Florida
University of Central Florida
Space advocacy organizations
1996 establishments in Florida